Maite Schwartz is an American film and television actress.

Schwartz was born in Dallas, Texas. She attended Booker T. Washington High School for the Performing and Visual Arts and received her BFA from Carnegie Mellon School of Drama in 2001.  Schwartz played Lisa on the online and cable TV series Quarterlife. Between 1999 and 2014 she appeared in roles on various television shows.

Filmography

Television

References

Interviews
 by Amrie Cunningham The TV Addict, "Exclusive Interview: QUARTERLIFE Star Maite Schwartz"

Reviews
by David Hinckley, NY Dailey News, February 26 2008, "Tale of blogger updates young-adult soap opera in 'quarterlife'", "...We like the vulnerable Dylan and her vulnerable roomies Debra (Michelle Lombardo) and Lisa (Maite Schwartz)..."
 by Joanne Weintraub, Milwaukee Journal Sentinel, February 23 2008, "'Quarterlife' puts coping on the line", "...and that the other, Lisa (Maite Schwartz), drank too much and was a little slutty...."
 buy Robert Bianco, USA Today, February 25 2008, "Tough to love 'Quarterlife' characters who sing me-me-me so much", "...She lives with actress/singer Lisa (Maite Schwartz) and longtime friend Debra..."
 Pittsburgh Post Gazette, July 29 1999, "...Maite Schwartz, a junior drama student at Carnegie Mellon, has a challenging role as Viola, a young woman shipwrecked off the coast who masquerades as a man..."
 by Phil Mushnick, New York Post, February 24 2008, 'WHY JANE'S SLIP CAN'T EVER BE TOPPED"], "...Beautiful Lisa (Maite Schwartz) longs to be an actress but has stage fright"

External links

American film actresses
American television actresses
Carnegie Mellon University College of Fine Arts alumni
Living people
Actresses from Dallas
Year of birth missing (living people)